Saturday Night and Sunday Morning is a 1958 novel by Alan Sillitoe.

Saturday Night and Sunday Morning or similar may also refer to:

Film and television
 Saturday Night and Sunday Morning (film), a 1960 film adaptation of Sillitoe's novel
 "Saturday Night and Sunday Morning", a 1991 episode of 2point4 Children
 "Saturday Night and Sunday Morning", a 2004 episode of Ghost in the Shell: Stand Alone Complex

Music
 Saturday Nights & Sunday Mornings, a 2008 album by Counting Crows  
 Saturday Night, Sunday Morning, a 1993 live album by The Stranglers
 Saturday Night, Sunday Morning (Jake Bugg album), 2021
 Saturday Night Sunday Morning, a 1989 album by The River Detectives
 Saturday Night Sunday Morning, a 2015 album by Chelsea
 Saturday Night – Sunday Morning, a 1988 album by Lonesome River Band
 Saturday Night/Sunday Morning, a 2014 album by Marty Stuart
 Saturday Night, Sunday Morning, a 1983 album by The Viletones
 Saturday Night, Sunday Morning, a 2004 EP by Starky
 "Saturday Night, Sunday Morning", a 1979 song by Thelma Houston
 "Saturday Night Sunday Morning", a song by Madness on the 1999 album Wonderful
 "Saturday Night and Sunday Morning", an instrumental track on Phil Collins' 1989 album ...But Seriously

Other uses
 Saturday Night, Sunday Morning, a 1999 drama by Archie Weller
 "Saturday Night, Sunday Morning", a track on the 1962 comedy album The First Family by Vaughn Meader
 Saturday Night Sunday Morning Records, a record label of Six by Seven

See also
 Saturday Night (disambiguation)